Gods Lake Narrows Water Aerodrome  was located adjacent to Gods Lake Narrows, Manitoba, Canada.

See also
Gods Lake Narrows Airport

References

Defunct seaplane bases in Manitoba